The Hotel Chancellor is a historic building in the Mid-Wilshire area of Los Angeles, California.  Built in 1924, it was for many years located on the block to the east of the city's famous Ambassador Hotel.  The structure was designed by Milton M. Friedman in the Beaux Arts style.  It has since been converted from a hotel to an apartment building.  In 2006, the building was listed on the National Register of Historic Places based on architectural criteria.

It is a five-story building designed with a lobby, a lounge/restaurant, and a banquet/ballroom on the ground level and in its partial basement level. It originally had 114 units on its four upper levels; these were modified to 106 units.

See also
 List of Registered Historic Places in Los Angeles

References

Hotel buildings completed in 1924
Apartment buildings in Los Angeles
Hotels in Los Angeles
Hotel buildings on the National Register of Historic Places in Los Angeles
Mid-Wilshire, Los Angeles